The 2014–15 Old Dominion Monarchs men’s basketball team represented Old Dominion University during the 2014–15 NCAA Division I men's basketball season. The Monarchs, led by second year head coach Jeff Jones, played their home games at Ted Constant Convocation Center and were members of the Conference USA. They finished the season 27–8, 13–5 in C-USA play to finish in a tie for second place. They lost in the quarterfinals of the C-USA tournament to Middle Tennessee. They were invited to the National Invitation Tournament where they defeated Charleston Southern in the first round, Illinois State in the second round, and Murray State in the quarterfinals to advance to the semifinals where they lost to Stanford.

Previous season
The Monarchs  the season 18–18, 9–7 in C-USA play to finish in sixth place. They advanced to the quarterfinals of the C-USA tournament to Middle Tennessee. They were invited to the College Basketball Invitational where they defeated South Dakota State and Radford to advance to the semifinals where they lost to Fresno State.

Pre-season

Departures

Incoming transfers

Incoming recruits

Roster

Depth chart

Schedule

|-
!colspan=9 style="background:#002B5F; color:#a8adb4;"| Exhibition

|-
!colspan=9 style="background:#002B5F; color:#a8adb4;"| Non-conference regular season

|-
!colspan=9 style="background:#002B5F; color:#a8adb4;"| Conference USA regular season

|-
!colspan=12 style="background:#002B5F; color:#a8adb4;"| Conference USA tournament

|-
!colspan=12 style="background:#002B5F; color:#a8adb4;"| NIT

Statistics
The team posted the following statistics:

Rankings

Awards

In-season

Postseason

 Jeff Jones
 Barefoot Coach of the Year
 Trey Freeman
All-Conference USA First Team
Conference USA Newcomer of the Year
NABC All-District 11 First Team
Conference USA All-Academic Team

See also
2014–15 Old Dominion Lady Monarchs basketball team

References

Old Dominion Monarchs men's basketball seasons
Old Dominion
Old Dominion
Old Dominion
Old Dominion